Dominica is an island-nation in the Caribbean that is part of the Lesser Antilles chain of islands. The island has active and extinct volcanoes.

References 

 
Dominica
Volcanoes
Dominica